Norway was represented by Karoline Krüger, with the song "For vår jord", at the 1988 Eurovision Song Contest, which took place on 30 April in Dublin. "For vår jord" was chosen as the Norwegian entry at the Melodi Grand Prix on 26 March.

Before Eurovision

Melodi Grand Prix 1988 
The MGP was held at the Château Neuf in Oslo, hosted by Dan Børge Akerø.

Competing entries

Semi-finals 
Before the final, sixteen songs took part over four semi-finals in which four songs were paired in each semi-final. The winner from each pair, chosen by a panel of 1,000 viewers, qualified for the final, along with two losing songs which were given wildcards.

The first semi-final was held on 30 January 1988. Four songs competed in pairs with the winner from each pair qualifying for the final.

The second semi-final was held on 13 February 1988. Four songs competed in pairs with the winner from each pair qualifying for the final.

The third semi-final was held on 27 February 1988. Four songs competed in pairs with the winner from each pair qualifying for the final.

The fourth semi-final was held on 12 March 1988. Four songs competed in pairs with the winner from each pair qualifying for the final.

Final 
Ten songs took part in the final, with the winner chosen by voting from seven regional juries. Other participants included three-time Norwegian representative and MGP regular Jahn Teigen and Tor Endresen, who would represent Norway in 1997.

At Eurovision 
On the night of the final Krüger performed 15th in the running order, following Greece and preceding Belgium. The gentle, melodic song was given a sophisticated, understated stage presentation with Krüger seated at a grand piano. At the close of voting "For vår jord" had picked up 88 points (including a maximum 12 from the United Kingdom), placing Norway 5th of the 21 entries. The Norwegian jury awarded its 12 points to Sweden.

Voting

References

External links 
Full national final on nrk.no

1988
Countries in the Eurovision Song Contest 1988
1988
Eurovision
Eurovision